Gijbeland is a village in the Dutch province of South Holland. It is a part of the municipality of Molenlanden.

In 2001, the village of Gijbeland had 435 inhabitants. The built-up area of the town was 0.068 km², and contained 183 residences.
The statistical area "Gijbeland", which also can include the peripheral parts of the village, as well as the surrounding countryside, has a population of around 930.

References

Populated places in South Holland
Molenlanden